Dunderberg Peak is located east of the Sierra Nevada crest near the divide between the Mono Basin and East Walker River basin (Conway Summit) in Mono County, in eastern California in the southwestern United States. The peak is in the Hoover Wilderness and is the highest point in Humboldt-Toiyabe National Forest.

History 
Dunderberg Peak, originally named Castle Peak, was renamed by a party of the Wheeler Survey after the mines upon its northerly slope in 1878.

Climate
Dunderberg Peak is located in an alpine climate zone. Most weather fronts originate in the Pacific Ocean, and travel east toward the Sierra Nevada mountains. As fronts approach, they are forced upward by the peaks (orographic lift), causing moisture in the form of rain or snowfall to drop onto the range.

See also 
 Virginia Peak, nearby

References

External links 
 
 

Mountains of Mono County, California
Mountains of the Sierra Nevada (United States)
North American 3000 m summits
Mountains of Northern California
Sierra Nevada (United States)